The Battle of Prosperous was a military engagement between British Crown forces and United Irishmen rebels during the Irish Rebellion of 1798 in the town of Prosperous, County Kildare. Prosperous was founded by Sir Robert Brooke in 1780 as a village for processing cotton produced in the Americas. When a rebellion spearheaded by the United Irishmen broke out against British rule in Ireland, rebel forces led by John Esmonde made plans to capture Prosperous.  Esmonde had 200 rebels under his command, while Prosperous was garrisoned by elements of the Royal Cork City Militia under the command of Captain Richard Swayne reinforced by detachments of a Welsh mounted fencible regiment, the Ancient British Regiment of Fencible Cavalry Dragoons (also known as the Ancient Britons), numbering 150 men in all.

On 24 May 1798, Esmonde led his forces to attack Prosperous. Their entry was preceded by the infiltration of a small rebel vanguard, who with the possible help of female sympathisers residing in Prosperous, scaled the walls of the town's barracks, killed the sentries and opened the town gates. The barracks were quickly surrounded and attacked by the rebels who repulsed an attempt by the garrison to break out; "Swayne himself was surprised in bed, shot and piked to death and his body burned in a tar barrel." The remainder of the garrison were trapped in the upper floors of the barracks which was set on fire by the rebels, causing them to jump in desperation onto the ground below, where they were summarily executed with pikes. While the rebels suffered no known casualties, c. 40 members of the garrison were killed in the battle.

10 members of the garrison, all belonging to the Ancient Britons, managed to escape from Prosperous to Dunlavin, County Wicklow, where they participated in the Dunlavin Green executions on 26 May. Esmonde was later captured by Crown forces and brought to Dublin for trial. As he had previously enlisted at the rank of lieutenant in the Clane Yeomanry, Esmonde was court-martialled on 13 June and found guilty of being a deserter. Esmonde was executed by hanging on 14 June at on Carlisle Bridge with his coat being worn reversed to indicate that he was convicted of desertion. Prosperous remained under the control of the United Irishmen until 19 June, when a detachment of the 5th Dragoon Guards under the command of Lieutenant-Colonel Stewart recaptured the town.

References

Battles of the Irish Rebellion of 1798
History of County Kildare